Tirachoidea cantori or Cantor's stick insect is a species of stick insect in the order Phasmatodea. It is commonly found in Peninsular Malaysia, Myanmar, Sumatra, and Thailand. Females of this species can reach over 200 mm. Males are winged.

External links
 Phasmid Study Group: Tirachoidea cantori

References

Phasmatidae
Insects described in 1859
Phasmatodea of Malesia